Moon Buggy may refer to:

Lunar Roving Vehicle (LRV), the rover vehicle of the NASA Apollo program in the 1970s
NASA Great Moonbuggy Race, a competition for young students to build and ride a foldable 3- to 4-wheel human powered vehicle for 2 riders, since 1994 in Huntsville, Alabama
One of the playable vehicles in Twisted Metal 4, videogame
A rover vehicle that appeared in the 1971 Diamonds Are Forever film

See also  
Buggy (disambiguation)